Karl Magnusson (died 1220)  was the Bishop of Linköping during 1216–1220.

Biography
Karl Magnusson was from the  Bjelbo dynasty or House of Folkung (Folkungaätten) and was a brother of Birger Magnusson (Birger Jarl), the most powerful man of Sweden in the middle of the 13th century
His father was Magnus Minnessköld (1180s-1208) and his mother was probably Ingrid Ylva (1180s-1250-1255).
He died at the Battle of Lihula in Estonia.

See also
Eskil Magnusson

References

1220 deaths
13th-century Roman Catholic bishops in Sweden
Bishops of Linköping
Year of birth unknown
Christians of the Livonian Crusade
Swedish military personnel killed in action